The Romanian Social Democratic Party (or , PSD) was a social-democratic political party in Romania. In the early 1920s, the Socialist Party of Romania split over the issue of affiliation with the Third International. The majority, which supported affiliation, evolved into the Communist Party of Romania in 1921, while the members who opposed the new orientation formed various political groupings, eventually reorganizing under a central leadership in 1927. From 1938 to 1944, the party was outlawed but remained active in clandestinity. After 1944, it allied with the Communists and eventually was forced to reunite with them to form the Workers' Party of Romania in 1948. It published the magazines Socialismul, Lumea Nouă, and Libertatea. After the end of the Communist single-party system in 1989, a group of former members created a new party which proclaimed itself the direct descendant of the PSD.

Foundation and World War II

The first organized party of the Romanian socialists, Romanian Social Democratic Workers' Party was founded in 1893, but was disbanded by the end of the decade after conflicts between the bourgeois leaders, who considered democratic reforms were possible only in alliance with the National Liberal Party, and the proletarian leaders and members, who wanted to continue as a strictly working class party. Lacking material means and organisational experience, the Marxists were only able to re-organise a socialist party in 1910, when the Social Democratic Party of Romania was founded. Outlawed during World War I, the party re-emerged in 1918 with a revolutionary programme, rebranding itself as the Socialist Party of Romania (PSR).

As following the war Romania acquired a large extent of new territories, the socialists toned down their objectives in order to accommodate the more reformist-minded Social Democratic Party of Transylvania and Banat and Social Democratic Party of Bukovina. Despite successive declarations in favour of uniting the three parties under a single central leadership, this objective was never completed, as the revolutionary and reformist factions came into open conflict. Unity projects where shattered after the social democrats, including most members of the Bukovina party, an important part of the Transylvanian party, and a minority in old Romania, broke from the party in February 1921, the moment it became clear that the communist faction had gained a majority in the central leadership. The majority of the PSR became increasingly favorable to the Bolshevik option, reforming itself as the Communist Party of Romania (PCdR, later PCR), in May 1921. A minority wing formed the Federation of Socialist Parties from Romania, which reformed as the Social Democratic Party in May 1927 and affiliated with the  International. The leader of the PSD in the following period was Constantin Titel Petrescu.

The party was a member of the Labour and Socialist International between 1923 and 1940.

Beginning with the late 1920s several groups left the party dissatisfied with what they perceived as the turn of the PSDR leadership to right-wing politics. Such groups included the Socialist Workers Party of Romania, founded in 1928 by a group around Leon Ghelerter (joined in 1931 by former communist leader Gheorghe Cristescu), and the Socialist Party (Partidul Socialist) created in 1933 by a group around Constantin Popovici. Shortly after the latter's creation, the factions joined to form the Unitary Socialist Party, only to split again in 1935.

Banned in 1938 by the personal dictatorship of King Carol II, the PSD remained active in clandestinity, peacefully resisting to the rise of Fascism, condemning the Iron Guard and the National Legionary State proclaimed in 1940. With the ascendancy of Ion Antonescu and Romania's participation in World War II alongside the Axis Powers (see Romania during World War II), the PSD, who remained favourable to the Allies, continued passive resistance to the regime.

In April 1944, the PCR and the PSD formed a United Workers' Front (Frontul Unic Muncitoresc), which was meant to coordinate actions from the left. In June the two parties, along with the National Peasants' Party and the National Liberals, created the clandestine National Democratic Bloc, which succeeded in overthrowing Antonescu's government on August 23, and backed the government of Constantin Sănătescu which declared war on the Axis.

Late 1940s

Subsequently, PSD entered talks with PCR representative Lucrețiu Pătrășcanu, leading to the creation of the National Democratic Front(Frontul Naţional Democrat, FND) in February 1945 (which grouped the two parties together with Petru Groza's Ploughmen's Front, Mihai Ralea's Socialist Peasants' Party, and Mitiță Constantinescu's Union of Patriots). Meant as an electoral alliance of the Left, the FND faced accusations from the PSD that it was becoming a tool for the PCR (especially after it had passed resolutions reflecting democratic centralism). An internal struggle ensued between the pro-communist wing and Titel Petrescu's supporters; Petrescu's faction (including Lazăr Măglaşu) left the PSD in March 1946 to found the Independent Social Democratic Party (Partidul Social Democrat Independent, PSDI), which presented itself as an independent faction in the November 1946 general election - these were won by the FND after a large-scale electoral fraud engineered by the Groza government.

The PCR seized full power in December 1947, beginning 42 years of Communist rule in Romania.  Under pressure from the PCR to create "a single party of the working class", the PSD under the leadership of Lothar Rădăceanu and Ștefan Voitec accepted Marxism-Leninism and reunited with the Communists in February 1948 to create the Romanian Workers' Party (Partidul Muncitoresc Român, PMR).  However, the few recalcitrant PSD members were quickly pushed out, leaving the PMR as a renamed and enlarged PCR.  The PMR changed its name back to the PCR in 1965.

Several former PSD members, including Titel Petrescu, were victims of political repression and many died in communist prisons.  On the other, hand, a number of former PSD members went on to high posts in the PMR/PCR.  Most notably, Voitec served as an important official in the government for all but a few years until his death in 1984.

Notable members

Tiron Albani
Vasile Anagnoste
Ștefan Baciu
Traian Cercega
Alexandru Claudian
Stavri Cunescu
Adrian Dimitriu
Doldi Filderman
Mircea Florian
Ioan Flueraş
Leon Ghelerter
Enea Grapini
George Grigorovici
Gheorghe Homasca
Tudor Ionescu
Theodor Iordăchescu
Iorgu Iordan
Iosif Jumanca
Mişa Levin
Lazăr Măglaşu
Ioan I. Mirescu
Ilie Moscovici
Constantin Motaş
Gheorghe Nicolau
Ion Pas
Pavel Pavel
Constantin Titel Petrescu
Dumitru Petrescu
Iacob Pistiner
Constantin Popovici
Dumitru Popp
Lothar Rădăceanu
Otto Roth
Emil Socor
Barbu Solomon
Şerban Voinea
Ştefan Voitec
Iancu Zissu

Electoral history

Legislative elections

See also
Social Democratic Labour Youth Union
Working Women's Union

References

External links
 Social Democratic history at the PSD site
 PSDR program of 1927

1927 establishments in Romania
1948 disestablishments in Romania
Defunct socialist parties in Romania
Members of the Labour and Socialist International
Political parties disestablished in 1948
Political parties established in 1927
Romanian Communist Party
Social democratic parties in Romania